The Senari languages form a central dialect cluster of the Senufo languages. They are spoken in northern Ivory Coast, southern Mali and southwest Burkina Faso by more than a million Senufo. Three varieties can be distinguished, 
Cebaara (Tyebaala)
Senara
Nyarafolo, 
all with several dialects. With 860,000 speakers, Cebaara (Tyembara) is the largest of the four; it is also the central variety, spoken around the traditional Senufo center Korhogo. Senara (190,000 native speakers) of the Laraba Province of Burkina Faso is a geographic outlier; intelligibility testing with Cebaara yields ratings between 42 and 74 per cent (SIL). Nyarafolo is spoken by 50,000 in northeast Ivory Coast around Ferkessédougou; Ethnologue reports a classification as Tagwana-Djimini rather than Senari. Within Senufo as a whole, the Senari languages are thought to be most closely related to the Karaboro languages.

References

External links
PanAfrican L10n page on Senufo-Senari

 
Senufo languages